Nanchang Xiangtang Airport, or Xiangtang Air Base, is a military airbase in Xiangtang, Jiangxi, China. It also served as the main civil airport of Nanchang from 1957 until 1999, when all commercial flights were transferred to the new Nanchang Changbei International Airport.

Location and facilities

History 
Xiangtang Air Base was built in 1952 by the People's Liberation Army Air Force. In August 1956, the Chinese government decided to convert the airbase into a dual-use military and civil airport. On 1 January 1957, Nanchang's first civil flight in the People's Republic of China era took off at Xiangtang, bound for Ganzhou. In Xiangtang's first full year of operation, it served a total of 102 passengers, which increased to 35,709 in 1980.

From March 1981 to early 1982, Xiangtang Airport's runway was strengthened and thickened, and Qingyunpu Airport temporarily served as Nanchang's main airport for nine months.

During the reform and opening era, air travel boomed and Xiangtang's passenger volume grew rapidly. It handled more than 100,000 passengers in 1989, and more than 800,000 in both 1995 and 1996. Although expanded twice, Xiangtang Airport was unable to accommodate the explosive growth in traffic.

In 1996, construction began for the Nanchang Changbei Airport to replace Xiangtang. When Changbei Airport was opened on 10 September 1999, all commercial flights were transferred to the new airport and Xiangtang reverted to sole military use. The airport currently hosts the 40th Air Brigade, equipped with approximately 70 J-16 fighters.

References 

Airports in Jiangxi
Transport in Nanchang
Airports established in 1952
1952 establishments in China
Airports established in 1957
1957 establishments in China
Defunct airports in China
Chinese Air Force bases
1999 disestablishments in China
Airports disestablished in 1999